Konstantin Vasilyevich Ivanov (– ) was a Chuvash poet and important figure in Chuvash literature.

Biography 

Konstantin Vasilyevich Ivanov was born in a peasant Chuvash family. Many of his relatives, who valued education, were literate, something unusual for the time. Ivanov's father was one of the richest people in the village and he ran a successful farm using his knowledge of agronomy and economics.

Ivanov joined his village's primary school when he was eight years old. He finished in 1902 and moved to Belebey City School for further studies, where he took a preparatory class at Simbirsk Chuvash Teacher's School. Two years later, at the age of 15, he enrolled at the Chuvash Educational Center.

It was there that he showed great interest in literature, read many novels on Russian and Western cultures, and enthusiastically studied painting and sculpture. When visiting home during vacation periods, he wrote down tall stories, local folk history, texts containing conspiracy theories, and folk prayers. This improved his appreciation of national identity and artistic people.

Due to his increasing interest in painting, Ivanov joined the Academy of Arts. He developed professional photography skills, which he used to depict many scenes from Simbirsk.

Following the events from 1905 to 1907, he released "Chuvash Marseillaise" (Get up, rise, Chuvash!).

Later, Ivanov translated Mikhail Lermontov's poems The Prisoner, Waves and People, Sail, Peaks, Cliff, Cup of Life, and, with much effort, the Chuvash arrangement of The Song of the Merchant Kalashnikov.

In the autumn of 1914, Ivanov contracted tuberculosis. He died on 13 March 1915 at the age of 24.

Literature 
 Yakovlev I.Y., My life: Memoirs, Moscow, Republica, 1997.
 Sirotkin M. Y., K. V. Ivanov, Essay, Cheboksary, 1955.
 Abashev V. N., Чувашская поэма/Chuvash poem, Cheboksary, 1964.
 Chuvash writers, Биобиблиографический справочник, Cheboksary, 1964.
 D. V. Gordeev, Yu. A. Silem, «Anthology of Chuvash literature», Cheboksary, 2003. .

External links
 Site of poet's museum in Slakbash village
 120 лет со дня рождения К.В. Иванова
 Константин Иванов
 Константин Иванов
 Выдающиеся люди Чувашии : Иванов Константин Васильевич
  Константин Васильевич Иванов
 Чебоксарцы устроили митинг в честь чувашского поэта
 К. В. Иванов ҫуралнӑранпа 120 ҫул
 Константин Иванов
 2015 год в Чувашской Республике объявлен Годом К.В. Иванова
 Чӑваш Енӗн паллӑ ҫыннисем: Иванов Константин Васильевич
  Константин Васильевич Иванов
 «Нарспи» аудиокӗнеке шорт-листа кӗнӗ

1890 births
1915 deaths
Russian male poets
Chuvash writers
Chuvash-language poets
20th-century Russian poets
Simbirsk Chuvash teacher's school alumni
20th-century Russian male writers
Poets from the Russian Empire
Translators from the Russian Empire
20th-century deaths from tuberculosis
Tuberculosis deaths in Russia